The 1990 BMW European Indoors was a women's tennis tournament played on indoor carpet courts at the Saalsporthalle Allmend in Zürich in Switzerland and was part of Tier II of the 1990 WTA Tour. It was the seventh edition of the tournament and was held from 8 October through 14 October 1990. First-seeded Steffi Graf won the singles title.

Finals

Singles
 Steffi Graf defeated  Gabriela Sabatini 6–3, 6–2
 It was Graf's 8th singles title of the year and the 52nd of her career.

Doubles
 Manon Bollegraf /  Eva Pfaff defeated  Catherine Suire /  Dianne Van Rensburg 7–5, 6–4

References

External links
 ITF tournament edition details
 Tournament draws

European Indoors
Zurich Open
1990 in Swiss tennis